Witch Creek, a populated locale in San Diego County, California between Ramona and Santa Ysabel.  Named for Witch Creek that flows through the area.

References

Unincorporated communities in San Diego County, California
Unincorporated communities in California